Sebastián Francisco de Miranda y Rodríguez de Espinoza (28 March 1750 – 14 July 1816), commonly known as Francisco de Miranda, was a Venezuelan military leader and revolutionary. Although his own plans for the independence of the Spanish American colonies failed, he is regarded as a forerunner of Simón Bolívar, who during the Spanish American wars of independence successfully liberated much of South America. He was known as "The First Universal Venezuelan" and "The Great Universal American".

Miranda led a romantic and adventurous life in the general political and intellectual climate that emerged from the Age of Enlightenment that influenced all of the Atlantic Revolutions. He participated in three major historical and political movements of his time: the American Revolutionary War, the French Revolution and the Spanish American wars of independence. He described his experiences over this time in his journal, which reached to 63 bound volumes. An idealist, he developed a visionary plan to liberate and unify all of Spanish America, but his own military initiatives on behalf of an independent Spanish America ended in 1812. He was handed over to his enemies and four years later, died in a Spanish prison.

Early life 
Miranda was born in Caracas, Venezuela Province, in the Spanish colonial Viceroyalty of New Granada, and baptized on 5 April 1750. His father, Sebastián de Miranda Ravelo, was a Spanish immigrant from the Canary Islands who had become a successful and wealthy merchant, and his mother, Francisca Antonia Rodríguez de Espinoza, was a wealthy Venezuelan. 
Growing up, Miranda enjoyed a wealthy upbringing and attended the finest private schools. However, he was not necessarily a member of high society; his father faced some discrimination from rivals due to his Canarian roots.

Education 
Miranda's father, Sebastián, always strove to improve the situation of the family, and in addition to accumulating wealth and attaining important positions, he ensured his children a college education. Miranda was first tutored by Jesuits, Jorge Lindo and Juan Santaella, before entering the Academy of Santa Rosa.

On 10 January 1762, Miranda began his studies at the Royal and Pontifical University of Caracas, where he studied Latin, the early grammar of Nebrija, and the Catechism of Ripalda for two years. Miranda completed this preliminary course in September 1764 and became an upperclassman. Between 1764 and 1766, Miranda continued his studies, studying the writings of Cicero and Virgil, grammar, history, religion, geography and arithmetic.

In June 1767, Miranda received his baccalaureate degree in the Humanities. It is unknown if Miranda received the title of Doctor, as the only evidence in favor of this title is his personal testimony stating he received it in 1767, at age 17.

Issues of ethnic lineage
Beginning in 1767, Miranda's studies were disrupted in part due to his father's rising prominence in Caracas society. In 1764, Sebastián de Miranda was appointed the captain of the local militia known as the Company of the White Canary Islanders by the governor, José Solano y Bote. Sebastián de Miranda directed his regiment for five years, but his new title and societal position bothered the white aristocracy (the Mantuanos). In retaliation, a competing faction formed a militia of its own and two local aristocrats, Don Juan Nicolas de Ponte and Don Martin Tovar Blanco, filed a complaint against Sebastián de Miranda.

Sebastián de Miranda requested and was granted honorary military discharge to avoid further antagonizing the local elite, and spent many years attempting to clear the family name and establish the "purity" of his family line. The need to establish the "cleanliness" of the family bloodline was important to maintain a place in society in Caracas, as it was what allowed the family to attend university, to marry in the church, and to attain government positions. In 1769, Sebastián produced a notarized genealogy to prove that his family had no African, Jewish or Muslim ancestors, according to the records in the National Archive of Venezuela. Miranda's father obtained a blood cleanliness certificate, which should not be confounded with the blood nobility certificate.

In 1770, Sebastián proved his family's rights through an official patent, signed by Charles III, which confirmed Sebastián's title and societal standing. The court ruling, however, created an irreconcilable enmity with the aristocratic elite, who never forgot the conflict nor forgave the challenge, which inevitably influenced subsequent decisions by Miranda.

Voyage to Spain (1771–1780) 
After the court victory of his father, Miranda decided to pursue a new life in Spain, and, on 25 January 1771, Miranda left Caracas from the port of La Guaira for Cadiz, Spain, on a Swedish frigate, the Prince Frederick. Miranda landed at the Port of Cadiz on 1 March 1771, where he stayed for two weeks with a distant relative, Jose D'Anino, before leaving for Madrid.

In Madrid 
On 28 March 1771, Miranda travelled to Madrid and took an interest in the libraries, architecture, and art that he found there. In Madrid, Miranda pursued his education, especially modern languages, as they would allow him to travel throughout Europe. He also sought to expand his knowledge of mathematics, history, and political science, as he aimed to serve the Spanish Crown as a military officer. During this time, he also pursued genealogical research of his family name to establish his ties to Europe and Christianity, which was especially important to him after his father's struggles to legitimize their family line in Caracas.

It was in Madrid that Miranda began to build his personal library, which he added to as he traveled, collecting books, manuscripts and letters.

In January 1773, Miranda's father transferred 85,000 reales vellon (silver coins), to help his son obtain the position of captain in the Princess's Regiment.

Early campaigns 
During his first year as a captain, Miranda traveled with his regiment mainly in North Africa and the southern Spanish province of Andalusia. In December 1774, Spain declared War with Morocco, and Miranda experienced his first combat during the conflict.

While Miranda was assigned to guard the stations of an unwanted colonial presence in North Africa, he began to draw connections to the similar colonial presence in Spanish South America. His first military feat took place during the Siege of Melilla, held from 9 December 1774 to 19 March 1775, in which the Spanish forces managed to repel the Moroccan sultan, Mohammed ben Abdallah. However, despite the actions taken and danger faced, Miranda did not get an award or promotion and was assigned to the garrison of Cadiz.

Despite Miranda's success in the military, he faced many disciplinary complaints, ranging from complaints that he spent too much time reading, to financial discrepancies, to the most serious disciplinary charges of violence and abuse of authority. One of Miranda's well-known enemies was Colonel Juan Roca, who charged Miranda with the loss of company funds and brutalities against soldiers in Miranda's regiment. The account of the dispute was sent to Inspector General O'Reilly and eventually reached King Charles III, who ordered Miranda to be transferred back to Cadiz.

Missions in America (1781–1784)

The American Revolution 
Spain became involved in the American Revolutionary War in order to expand their territories in Louisiana and Florida and to seek a recapture of Gibraltar. The Spanish Captain-General of Louisiana, Bernardo de Gálvez, in 1779 launched several offensives at Baton Rouge and Natchez, securing the way for the reconquest of Florida.

Spanish forces had begun mobilising to support their American allies, and Miranda was ordered to report to the Regiment of Aragon, which sailed from Cadiz in spring of 1780 under Victoriano de Navia's command. Miranda reported to his chief, General Juan Manuel Cagigal y Monserrat, in Havana, Cuba. From their headquarters in Cuba, de Cagigal and Miranda participated in the Siege of Pensacola on 9 May 1781, and Miranda was awarded the temporary title of lieutenant colonel during this action. Miranda also contributed to the French success during the Battle of the Chesapeake when he helped the Comte de Grasse raise needed funds and supplies for the battle.

The Antilles 
Miranda remained prominent while in Pensacola, and in August 1781, Cagigal secretly sent Miranda to Jamaica to arrange for the release of 900 prisoners-of-war, see to their immediate needs, and acquire auxiliary vessels for the Spanish Navy. Miranda was also asked to perform espionage work while staying with his British hosts. Miranda managed to perform a successful reconnaissance mission and also negotiated an agreement dated 18 November 1781, that regulated the exchange of Spanish prisoners. However, Miranda also entered into a deal with a local merchant, Philip Allwood. Miranda agreed to use the ships he had purchased during his stay in Jamaica to transport Allwood's goods back to Spain to sell them. Upon his return, Miranda was charged with being a spy and smuggler of enemy goods. The order to send Miranda back to Spain pursuant to the judgment of 5 February 1782, of the Supreme Inquisition Council failed to be met due to various faults of form and substance in the administrative process that caused the order to be questioned and, in part, by Cagigal's unconditional support of Miranda.

Miranda participated in the Capture of the Bahamas and carried news of the island's fall to Gálvez. Gálvez was angry that the Bahamas expedition had gone ahead without his permission, and he imprisoned Cagigal and had Miranda arrested. Miranda was later released, but this experience of Spanish officialdom may have been a factor in his subsequent conversion to the idea of independence for Spain's American colonies. The efficiency demonstrated by Miranda in the Bahamas led Cagigal to recommend that Miranda be promoted to colonel under the command of the General Commander of the Spanish forces in Cuba, Bernardo de Gálvez, in St. Domingue, which the Spanish American authorities referred to Guarico. This should not be confused with the current Guárico State located today in central Venezuela.

At that time, the Spaniards were preparing a joint action with the French to invade Jamaica, which was a major British stronghold in the region, and Guárico was the ideal place to plan these operations, being close to the island and providing easy access for troops and commanders. Miranda was seen as the right person to plan operations because he had firsthand knowledge of the disposition of the troops and fortifications in Jamaica. However, the Royal Navy decisively defeated the French fleet at the Battle of the Saintes, so the invasion did not materialise and Miranda remained in Guarico.

Exile in the United States 
With the failure of the invasion of Jamaica, priorities for the Spanish authorities changed, and the process of the Inquisition against Miranda gained momentum. The authorities sent Miranda to Havana to be arrested and sent to Spain. In February 1783, Minister of the Indies José de Gálvez sent the Captain General of Havana, Don Luis de Unzaga y Amézaga to arrest him. The information of his impending arrest reached Miranda in advance. Aware that he would not be given a fair trial in Spain, Miranda managed, with the help of Cajigal and the American James Seagrove, to slip away on a ship bound for the United States, arriving at New Bern, North Carolina on 10 July 1783. During his time in the United States, Miranda made a critical study of its military defenses, demonstrating extensive knowledge of the development of American conflict and circumstances.

While there, Miranda prepared and fixed a correspondence technique, used for the rest of his journey: he would meet people through the gift or loan of books, and examine the culture and customs of the places through which he passed in a methodical way. Passing through Charleston, Philadelphia, and Boston, he dealt with different characters in American society. In New York City he met the prominent and politically connected Livingston family. Apparently Miranda had a romantic relationship with Susan Livingston, daughter of Chancellor Livingston. Although Miranda wrote to her for years, he never saw her again after leaving New York.

During his time in the United States, Miranda met with many important people. He was personally acquainted with George Washington in Philadelphia. He also met General Henry Knox, Thomas Paine, Alexander Hamilton, Samuel Adams, and Thomas Jefferson. He also visited various institutions of the new nation that impressed him such as the Library of Newport and Princeton College.

In Europe (1785–1790)

Great Britain 
On 15 December 1784, Miranda left the port of Boston in the merchant frigate Neptuno for London and arrived in England on 10 February 1785. While in London, Miranda was discreetly watched by the Spanish, who were suspicious of him. The reports highlight that Miranda had meetings with people suspected of conspiring against Spain and people considered among the eminent scholars of the time.

Prussia 
The first secretary of the U.S. embassy, Colonel William Stephens Smith, whom Miranda knew from his stay in New York, came to England at around the same time. The US Ambassador was John Adams. Miranda visited them many times and continued the conversations about independence he had had with General Washington, Jefferson, Hamilton, Knox, among many other patriots in Philadelphia, New York, and other cities. Miranda and Smith decided to travel to Prussia to attend military exercises prepared by Prussian king, Frederick the Great. Bernardo del Campo, ambassador of Spain in the British capital since 1783, kept Miranda entertained with the idea that the king was close to resolve his situation. In fact, he was keeping Miranda under surveillance. When Miranda announced his sudden trip to continental Europe, he "gladly" gave Miranda a letter of introduction to the minister (ambassador) of Spain in Berlin who would be in charge of reporting frequently to Madrid.  James Penman, an English businessman whom Miranda had befriended in Charleston, was responsible for keeping his papers while he traveled.

However, the Spanish ambassador had secretly intrigued to have Miranda arrested when he reached Calais, France, where he could be handed over to Spain. The plan fell apart because the Venezuelan and his friend went on 10 August 1785 to a Dutch port (Hellevoetsluis) instead.

Sweden 
Between September and December 1787 Miranda travelled through Sweden, and he also visited Norway. Miranda arrived in Stockholm on 21 September 1787, from Saint Petersburg, and he stayed in the city until 24 September, returning on 3 October and then staying for almost a month until 1 November. He carried a letter of recommendation from empress Catherine the Great and was also shown support from the Russian ambassador in Stockholm Andrey Razumovsky. Through these connections he was invited to Stockholm Palace and an audience with king Gustav III on 17 October. However, the Spanish ambassador in Stockholm, Ignacio de Corral, demanded that Miranda should be extradited in December, at which time he had already left. He did not win support for his cause, but he later published excerpts from his journal about his experiences in Sweden. When visiting Gothenburg he had an affair with Christina Hall, the wife of one of the wealthiest merchants of Gothenburg John Hall. He also visited the family's country retreat, Gunnebo House, on the outskirts of the city.

Russia 
Miranda then travelled throughout Europe, including present-day Belgium, Germany, Austria, Hungary, Poland, Greece and Italy, where he remained for over a year. After passing through Constantinople, Turkey, he visited the court of Catherine the Great, who was visiting Kiev and the Crimea. In Crimea, Miranda was received by the influential Prince Grigory Potemkin and later on, when the empress arrived, he was introduced to her. His sojourn in Russia took much longer because of the unexpected hospitality and attention received by the court and the empress. When she realized the dangers surrounding him, particularly the Inquisition order for his apprehension, she decided to protect him at all cost. She instructed all Russian ambassadors in Europe to assist him in any form and with great care, in order to protect him from the persecution in place. She extended him a Russian passport. He was also introduced to the king of Poland, Stanisław II August, with whom he exchanged many intellectual and political views on America and Europe. The king invited him to Poland. In Hungary, he stayed in the palace of Prince Nicholas Esterházy, who was sympathetic to his ideas, and wrote him a letter of recommendation to meet the musician Joseph Haydn.

Attempts to abduct Miranda by the diplomatic representatives of Spain failed as the Russian ambassador in London, Semyon Vorontsov, declared on 4 August 1789, to the Secretary of State for Foreign Affairs, Francis Osborne, that Miranda, although a Spanish subject, was a member of the Russian diplomatic mission in London.

Miranda made use of the Spanish–British diplomatic row known as the Nootka Crisis in February 1790 to present to some British cabinet ministers his ideas about the independence of Spanish territories in America.

Miranda and the French Revolution (1791–1798) 

Starting in 1791, Miranda took an active part in the French Revolution as marechal de camp. In Paris, he befriended the Girondists Jacques Pierre Brissot and Jérôme Pétion de Villeneuve, and he briefly served as a general in the section of the French Revolutionary Army commanded by Charles François Dumouriez, fighting in the 1792 campaign of Valmy.

The Army of the North (Armée de la Belgique) commanded by Miranda laid siege to Antwerp. When Miranda (and John Skey Eustace) failed to take Maastricht in February 1793 they were arrested  on the orders of Antoine Quentin Fouquier-Tinville, Chief Prosecutor of the Revolution, and accused of conspiring against the republic with Charles François Dumouriez, the renegade general, who quickly defected  to the enemy. Though indicted before the Revolutionary Tribunal – and under attack in Jean-Paul Marat's L'Ami du peuple – he and his lawyer Claude François Chauveau-Lagarde conducted his defence with such calm eloquence that he was declared innocent.

However, Marat denounced Chauveau-Lagarde as a liberator of the guilty. Even so, the campaign of Marat and the rest of the Jacobins against him did not weaken. He was arrested again in July 1793 and incarcerated in La Force prison, effectively one of the ante-chambers of death during the prevailing Reign of Terror. Appearing again before the tribunal, he accused the Committee of Public Safety of tyranny in disregarding his previous acquittal.

Miranda seems to have survived by a combination of good luck and political expediency: the revolutionary government simply could not agree on what to do with him. He remained in La Force even after the fall of Robespierre in July 1794, and was not finally released until January of the following year. The art theorist Quatremère de Quincy was among those who campaigned for his release during this time. Now convinced that the whole direction taken by the Revolution had been wrong, he started to conspire with the moderate royalists against the Directory, and was even named as the possible leader of a military coup. He was arrested and ordered out of the country, only to escape and go into hiding.

He reappeared after being given permission to remain in France, though that did not stop his involvement in yet another monarchist plot in September 1797. The police were ordered to arrest the "Peruvian general", as the said general submerged himself yet again in the underground. With no more illusions about France or the Revolution, he left for England in a Danish boat, arriving in Dover in January 1798.

Expeditions in South America (1804–1808)

Diplomatic negotiations, 1804–1805 
In 1804 with informal British help, Miranda presented a military plan to liberate the Captaincy General of Venezuela from Spanish rule. At the time, Britain was at war with Spain, an ally of Napoleon. Home Riggs Popham was commissioned by prime minister Pitt in 1805 to study the plans proposed by Miranda to the British Government, Popham then persuaded the authorities that, as the Spanish Colonies were discontented, it would be easier to promote a rising in Buenos Aires. Disappointed by this decision in November 1805, Miranda travelled to New York, where he rekindled his acquaintance with William S. Smith to organize an expedition to liberate Venezuela. Smith introduced him to merchant Samuel Ogden.

Venezuela and the Caribbean, 1806 
Miranda then went to Washington for private meetings with President Thomas Jefferson and Secretary of State James Madison, who met with Miranda but did not involve themselves or their nation in his plans, which would have been a violation of the Neutrality Act of 1794. In New York Miranda privately began organizing a filibustering expedition to liberate Venezuela. Along with Colonel Smith he raised private funds, procured weapons, and recruited soldiers of fortune. Among the 200 volunteers who served under him in this revolt were Smith's son William Steuben and David G. Burnet, who would later serve as interim president of the Republic of Texas after its secession from Mexico in 1836. Miranda hired a ship of 20 guns from Ogden, which he rechristened Leander in honor of his oldest son, and set sail to Venezuela on 2 February 1806.

In Jacmel, Haiti, Miranda acquired two other ships, the Bee and the Bacchus, and their crews. It was in Jacmel on 12 March that Miranda made and raised on the Leander, the first Venezuelan flag, which he had personally designed. On 28 April, a botched landing attempt in Ocumare de la Costa resulted in two Spanish garda costas, Argos and Celoso, capturing the Bacchus and the Bee.  Sixty men were imprisoned and put on trial in Puerto Cabello accused of piracy. Ten were sentenced to death, hanged and dismembered in quarters. One of the victims was the printer Miles L. Hall, who for that reason has been considered as the first martyr of the printing press in Venezuela.

Miranda aboard of the Leander escaped, escorted by the packet ship HMS Lilly to the British islands of Grenada, Trinidad, and Barbados, where he met with Admiral Alexander Cochrane. As Spain was then at war with Britain, Cochrane and the governor of Trinidad Sir Thomas Hislop, 1st Baronet agreed to provide some support for a second attempt to invade Venezuela.

The Leander left Port of Spain on 24 July, together with HMS , HMS , HMS  , and HMS Lilly, carrying General Miranda and some 220 officers and men. General Miranda decided to land in La Vela de Coro and the squadron anchored there on 1 August. The next day the frigate HMS  joined them for three days. On 3 August, 60 Trinidadian volunteers under the Count de Rouveray, 60 men under Colonel Dowie, and 30 seamen and marines from HMS Lilly under Lieutenant Beddingfelt landed. This force cleared the beach of Spanish forces and captured a battery of four 9- and 12-pounder guns; the attackers had four men severely wounded, all from HMS Lilly. Shortly thereafter, boats from HMS Bacchante landed American volunteers and seamen and marines. The Spanish retreated, which enabled this force to capture two forts mounting 14 guns.

General Miranda then marched on and captured Santa Ana de Coro, but found no support from the city residents. However, on 8 August a Spanish force of almost 2,000 men arrived. They captured a master of transport and 14 seamen who were getting water, unbeknownst to Lieutenant Donald Campbell. HMS Lilly landed 20 men on the morning of 10 August; this landing party killed a dozen Spaniards, but was able to rescue only one of the captive seamen. Colonel Downie and 50 men were sent, but the colonel judged the enemy force too strong and withdrew. When another 400 men came from Maracaibo, General Miranda realized that his force was too small to achieve anything further or to hold Coro for long. On 13 August, Miranda ordered his force to set sail again. HMS Lilly and her squadron then carried him and his men safely to Aruba.

In the aftermath of the failed expedition, the Marquis Casa de Irujo, Spanish minister in Washington, denounced the United States support given to General Miranda to invade Venezuela in violation of the Neutrality Act of 1794. The Municipal Council of Caracas indicted Miranda in absence charged him as pirate and traitor condemned to death penalty. The Colonel Smith and Ogden were indicted by a federal grand jury in New York for piracy and violating the Neutrality Act of 1794. Put on trial Colonel Smith claimed his orders came from President Thomas Jefferson and Secretary of State James Madison, who refused to appear in court. Both Colonel Smith and Ogden stood trial and were found not guilty.

Project to attack Venezuela, 1808 
Miranda spent the next year in Trinidad as host of governor Hyslop waiting for reinforcements that never came. On his return to London, he was met with better support for his plans from the British government after the failed invasions of Buenos Aires (1806–1807). In 1808 a large military force to attack Venezuela was assembled and placed under the command of Arthur Wellesley, but Napoleon's invasion of Spain suddenly transformed Spain into an ally of Britain, and the force instead went there to fight in the Peninsular War.

The First Republic of Venezuela (1811–1812)

Return to Venezuela 
Venezuela achieved de facto independence on Maundy Thursday 19 April 1810, when the Supreme Junta of Caracas was established and the colonial administrators deposed. The Junta sent a delegation to Great Britain to get British recognition and aid. This delegation, which included future Venezuelan notables Simón Bolívar and Andrés Bello, met with and persuaded Miranda to return to his native land. In 1811 a delegation from the Supreme Junta, among them Bolívar, and a crowd of common people enthusiastically received Miranda in La Guaira. In Caracas he agitated for the provisional government to declare independence from Spain under the rule of Joseph Bonaparte.

Miranda gathered around him a group of similarly minded individuals and helped establish an association, la Sociedad Patriotica, modeled on the political clubs of the French Revolution. By the end of the year, the Venezuelan provinces elected a congress to deal with the future of the country, and Miranda was chosen as the delegate from El Pao, Barcelona Province. On 5 July 1811, it formally declared Venezuelan independence and established a republic. The congress also adopted his tricolour as the Republic's flag.

Decay of the First Republic of Venezuela

Crisis of the Republic 
The following year Miranda and the young Republic's fortunes turned. Republican forces failed to subdue areas of Venezuela (the provinces of Coro, Maracaibo and Guyana) that had remained royalist. In addition, Venezuela's loss of the Spanish market for its main export, cocoa, caused an economic crisis, which mostly hurt the middle and lower classes, who lost enthusiasm for the Republic. Finally a powerful earthquake and its aftershocks hit the country, which caused large numbers of deaths and serious damage to buildings, mostly in republican areas.

It did not help that it hit on 26 March 1812, as services for Maundy Thursday were beginning. The Caracas Junta had been established on a Maundy Thursday, 19 April 1810 as well, so the earthquake fell on its second anniversary in the liturgical calendar. This was interpreted by many as a sign from Providence. It was explained by royalist authorities as divine punishment for the rebellion against the Spanish Crown.

The archbishop of Caracas, Narciso Coll y Prat, referred to the event as "the terrifying but well-deserved earthquake" that "confirms in our days the prophecies revealed by God to men about the ancient impious and proud cities: Babylon, Jerusalem and the Tower of Babel".  Many, including those in the Republican army and the majority of the clergy, began to secretly plot against the Republic or outright defect. Other provinces refused to send reinforcements to Caracas Province. Worse still, whole provinces began to switch sides. On 4 July, an uprising brought Barcelona over to the royalist side.

Miranda's dictatorship 
Neighboring Cumaná, now cut off from the Republican centre, refused to recognize Miranda's dictatorial powers and his appointment of a commandant general. By the middle of the month, many of the outlying areas of Cumaná Province had also defected to the royalists. With these circumstances a Spanish marine frigate captain, Domingo Monteverde, operating out of Coro, was able to turn a small force under his command into a large army, as people joined him on his advance towards Valencia, leaving Miranda in charge of only a small area of central Venezuela. In these dire circumstances Miranda was given broad political powers by his government.

Defeat of the Republican army 
Bolívar lost control of San Felipe Castle of Puerto Cabello along with its ammunition stores on 30 June 1812. Deciding that the situation was lost, Bolívar effectively abandoned his post and retreated to his estate in San Mateo. By mid-July Monteverde had taken Valencia and Miranda also saw the republican cause as lost. He started negotiations with royalists that finalised an armistice on 25 July 1812, signed in San Mateo. Then Colonel Bolívar and other revolutionary officers claimed his actions as treasonous.

Miranda's arrest 
Bolívar and others arrested Miranda and handed him over to the Spanish Royal Army in La Guaira port. For his apparent services to the royalist cause, Monteverde granted Bolívar a passport, and Bolívar left for Curaçao on 27 August. Miranda went to the port of La Guaira intending to leave on a British ship before the royalists arrived, although under the armistice there was an amnesty for political offenses. Bolívar claimed afterwards that he wanted to shoot Miranda as a traitor but was restrained by the others; Bolívar's reasoning was that, "if Miranda believed the Spaniards would observe the treaty, he should have remained to keep them to their word; if he did not, he was a traitor to have sacrificed his army to it."

By handing over Miranda to the Spanish, Bolívar assured himself a passport from the Spanish authorities (passports which, nevertheless, had been guaranteed to all republicans who requested them by the terms of the armistice), which allowed him to leave Venezuela unmolested, and Miranda thought that the situation was hopeless.

Last years (1813–1816) 
Miranda never saw freedom again. His case was still being processed when he died in a prison cell at the Penal de las Cuatro Torres at the Arsenal de la Carraca, outside Cádiz, aged 66, on 14 July 1816. He was buried in a mass grave, making it impossible to identify his remains, so an empty tomb has been left for him in the National Pantheon of Venezuela.

Miranda's ideals

Political beliefs 
Miranda has long been associated with the struggle of the Spanish colonies in Latin America for independence. He envisioned an independent empire consisting of all the territories that had been under Spanish and Portuguese rule, stretching from the Mississippi River to Cape Horn. This empire was to be under the leadership of a hereditary emperor called the "Inca", in honor of the great Inca Empire, and would have a bicameral legislature. He conceived the name Colombia for this empire, after the explorer Christopher Columbus.

Freemasonry
Similarly to some others in the history of American Independence (George Washington, José de San Martín, Bernardo O'Higgins and Simón Bolívar), Miranda was a Freemason. In London he founded the lodge "The Great American Reunion".

Personal life 
After fighting for Revolutionary France, Miranda finally made his home in London, where he had two children, Leandro (1803 – Paris, 1886) and Francisco (1806 – Cerinza, Colombia, 1831), with his housekeeper, Sarah Andrews, whom he later married. He had a friendship with the painter James Barry, the uncle of the surgeon James Barry; Miranda helped to keep the secret that the latter was biologically female. According to historian Linda de Pauw, "Miranda was an ardent feminist, named women as his literary executors, and published an impassioned plea for female education a year before Mary Wollstonecraft published her famous Vindication of the Rights of Women."

Legacy and honours

 An oil painting by the Venezuelan artist Arturo Michelena, Miranda en la Carraca (1896), which portrays the hero in the Spanish jail where he died, has become a graphic symbol of Venezuelan history, and has immortalized the image of Miranda for generations of Venezuelans.
 In France, the name of Miranda remains engraved on the Arc de Triomphe of Paris, which was built during the First Empire, and his portrait is in the Palace of Versailles. His statue is in the Square de l'Amérique-Latine in the 17th arrondissement.
 Miranda's name has been honored several times, including in the name of the Venezuelan state, Miranda (created in 1889), a Venezuelan harbour, Puerto Miranda, a subway station and an important main avenue in Caracas, as well as a number of Venezuelan municipalities named "Miranda" or "Francisco de Miranda".
 Both Caracas airbase and a Caracas park are named after him.
 The Order of Francisco de Miranda was established in 1939 destined to reward the services done to science, to the progress of the country and to outstanding merit.
 In 2006, Venezuela's Flag Day was moved to 3 August, in honor of Miranda's 1806 disembarkation at La Vela de Coro.
 One of the Bolivarian missions, Mission Miranda, is named after him.
 Miranda's life was portrayed in the Venezuelan film Francisco de Miranda (2006), as well as in the unrelated film Miranda Returns (2007).
José Antonio Calcaño, Venezuelan composer his best-known work is the ballet Miranda en Rusia.
 Pensacola, Florida, has a square named after him.
 There are statues of Miranda in Ankara, Bogotá, Caracas, Cadiz (Spain), Havana, London, Paris, Patras (Greece), Pensacola (USA), Philadelphia, Funchal, São Paulo (Brazil), St. Petersburg (Russia), Puerto de La Cruz (Spain), and Valmy (France).
 The house where Miranda lived in London, 27 Grafton Street (now 58 Grafton Way), Bloomsbury, has a blue plaque that bears his name, and functions today as the Consulate of Venezuela in the United Kingdom.
 The Miranda archive called Colombeia rests in the Archivo General de la Nación de Venezuela. In 2007, the UNESCO included this collection in the  Memory of the World 
 Register.
 In 2016 the Municipal Council of Caracas agreed to pardon Miranda by acquitting him of charges of treason, piracy, including the death penalty, imposed by the colonial councilors in 1806 after the failed attempt to liberate Venezuela from Spanish rule. At the commemoration of the bicentennial anniversary of his death, the Executive posthumously conferred on him the title of Chief Admiral.
 The Venezuelan Remote Sensing Satellite-1 (VRSS-1), launched in 2012, was named after him.

Gallery

References

Further reading
Chavez, Thomas E. Spain and the Independence of the United States: An Intrinsic Gift. University of New Mexico Press, 2003.
Juan Carlos Chirinos. Miranda, el nómada sentimental. Editorial Norma, Caracas, 2006.  / Ediciones Ulises, Sevilla, 2017 
  This cites the following references:
 Biggs, James. History of Miranda's Attempt in South America, London, 1809.
 The Marqués de Rojas, El General Miranda, Paris, 1884.
 The Marqués de Rojas Miranda dans la révolution française, Carácas, 1889.
 Robertson, W. S. Francisco de Miranda and the Revolutionizing of Spanish America, Washington, 1909.
Harvey, Robert. "Liberators: Latin America`s Struggle For Independence, 1810-1830". John Murray, London (2000). 
Miranda, Francisco de. (Judson P. Wood, translator. John S. Ezell, ed.) The New Democracy in America: Travels of Francisco de Miranda in the United States, 1783–84. Norman: University of Oklahoma Press, 1963.
Racine, Karen. Francisco De Miranda: A Transatlantic Life in the Age of Revolution. Wilmington, Del: SR Books, 2003. 
Robertson, William S. "Francisco de Miranda and the Revolutionizing of Spanish America" in Annual Report of the American Historical Association for the Year 1907, Vol. 1. Washington: Government Printing Office, 1908. 189–539.
Robertson, William S. Life of Miranda, 2 vols. Chapel Hill: University of North Carolina Press, 1929.
Rumazo González, Alfonso. Francisco de Miranda. Protolíder de la Independencia Americana (Biografía). Caracas: Ediciones de la Presidencia de la República, 2006.
Smith, Denis. General Miranda's Wars: Turmoil and Revolt in Spanish America, 1750-1816. Toronto, Bev Editions (e-book), 2013.
Thorning, Joseph F. Miranda: World Citizen. Gainesville: University of Florida Press, 1952.
Moisei Alperovich . "Francisco de Miranda y Rusia", V Centenario del descubrimiento de América: encuentro de culturas y continentes. Editorial Progreso, (Moscu), shortened version in Spanish, (1989), Edit. Progreso, URSS, 380 pages. Russian Version : unabridged, (1986).
Miranda, Omar F. "The Celebrity of Exilic Romance: Francisco de Miranda and Lord Byron." European Romantic Review 27.2 (2016)

External links 

Colombeia (In Spanish) – The complete digitized files of Francisco de Miranda, mostly in Spanish, with translations of his documents written in English and French. More than 15 volumes in relation to Miranda's voyages, the French Revolution and the negotiations of Miranda with foreign nations, specially Great Britain.
Grogan, Samuel "Francisco de Miranda", History Text Archive
Another statue by Lorenzo Gonzalez (1977) on the Benjamin Franklin Parkway, Philadelphia
"General Miranda's Expedition", Atlantic Monthly, Vol. 5, No. 31 (May 1860). An account of the Leander affair
Diarios: Una selección 1771 – 1800  – Selections from the diaries of Francisco de Miranda, 1771–1800, Caracas: Monte Avila, 2006

Full text archive of 'General Miranda's Expedition', from the Atlantic Monthly May 1860

1750 births
1816 deaths
Francisco de Miranda
People from Caracas
Central University of Venezuela alumni
French Republican military leaders of the French Revolutionary Wars
Male feminists
People of the Venezuelan War of Independence
Prisoners who died in Spanish detention
Spanish military personnel of the American Revolutionary War
Venezuelan soldiers
Venezuelan generals
Venezuelan revolutionaries
Venezuelan politicians
Flag designers
French generals
Military leaders of the French Revolutionary Wars
French military personnel of the French Revolutionary Wars
Venezuelan people of Canarian descent
Venezuelan Freemasons
Venezuelan people of Spanish descent
Generalissimos
19th-century Venezuelan people
18th-century Venezuelan people
Names inscribed under the Arc de Triomphe